Clean is a 2021 American action thriller film directed by Paul Solet and starring Adrien Brody, who also produced and wrote the film.

Plot
In Utica, New York, a truck driver nicknamed “Clean” works as a garbage collector in a decaying urban residential neighborhood filled with criminals. During his job, he collects usable parts and after work, he salvages,  repairs, and sells them to a thrift shop owned by one of his acquaintances. Since divorcing his wife, Clean has lived alone in a workshop while his daughter has long since died. He is always haunted and tortured by the memories of what happened to his beloved daughter and the crimes he had committed in the past. He prepared a meal the next morning for his neighbor, a teenage girl named Dianda, who is living with her grandmother.

Meanwhile, a man named Michael is waiting for his son, Mikey, outside the prison gates. As Michael was about to go and meet his son, Mikey is instead picked up by his friends and drives away with them. Annoyed with Mikey’s behavior, he decided to let it slide. 
While picking up trash in the evening near a seafood restaurant owned by Michael, Clean notices Michael and his armed goons are in the middle of a drug trafficking deal which they smuggle through the fish’s body from China. However, Clean continued to do his job as usual. Michael is upset that the Chinese suppliers have shorted him five pouches of cocaine, totalling 200 grams.

The next morning, Clean sees Dianda walking down the street and was told that her school bus no longer operates in her area due to service cuts. He offers to drive Dianda to school. After sending her to school, Clean dropped off a bike at Dianda’s house that belonged to his daughter. However, Dianda’s grandmother, Ethel, came out and asked why Clean was so concerned about her. Clean replied he did it to save himself from the guilt that always tormented him. Following this, Ethel tells him that he’s a nice guy. But Clean responded back that he’s not.

At Michael’s restaurant, he beats one of his Chinese partners to death for shorting him on the cocaine. Mikey, who saw his father’s actions was silent in horror by his father’s cruelty. That evening, Clean notices the blood and the glasses of Michael’s partner that he brutally murdered while emptying the trash container. As he empties the container, Michael suddenly appears behind him and apologizes for the stench. He tries to offer some money for Clean, but Clean refuses and continues doing his job.

The next day, Clean’s car breaks down in a bad neighborhood. While looking for the problem, a group of thugs chase a man past Clean into an alley. Clean follows them into the alley when suddenly one of the thugs appears behind him and knocks him out with a baseball bat. Clean wakes up in a hospital and was told a doctor to take prescribed medication, but Clean refuses and chose to go straight home.

The next day while on paid leave, Clean drives by and sees Dianda hanging with some thugs. He tells her that it’s getting late and go home. Dianda coldly replies he’s not her father to order her around. The thugs get confrontational and order Clean to leave. However, Dianda finally agrees with Clean’s request to avoid an argument. 

At Michael's home, Michael gets into a heated argument with his son at dinner for hanging out with his friends instead of helping him running a drug business. Mikey then threatens him with a knife and decided to run away from home.

Clean works to cleanup an abandoned building and finds a large pipe wrench inside. He finds Dianda being force-fed drugs and alcohol by the thugs. The thugs set up a phone to record what they're doing. Clean beats the thugs with the pipe wrench and takes Dianda back to her grandmother's home. One of the thugs is Michael’s son.

The next morning, Michael stands over Mikey at home. He is told that Mikey needs surgery or he might never speak again, but Michael refuses so Mikey can learn a lesson from his disobedience. Michael watches the recording from the prior night, revealing Clean’s identity. He orders Frank, a corrupt police officer, to kill Dianda and her grandmother first and bring Clean alive.

Clean attempts to leave the city with Dianda and Ethel, but notices that he’s being followed. While being pulled over, he recognizes the police officer as one who has been bribed by Michael. He speeds off but his car starts breaking down although he manages to evade the police. They then stop at a bowling alley and diner. Dianda escorts her grandmother to use the restroom while Clean looks around the parking a lot for a vehicle to steal. Some of Michael’s henchmen notice his car and enter the diner. They chase Dianda and Ethel to the back rooms of the building. Clean intercepts them and kills each one in brutal hand-to-hand combat.

After stopping at a motel for the night, Ethel blames Clean for putting them in danger and for not being able to return home. Clean vows to make things right and returns to the neighborhood. He returns to his residence to collect the money that he had to buy weapons from his friend’s thrift shop and prepares for his fight with Michael.

At Michael’s residence, Frank gets a call from one of his fellow officers. He learns that Clean was a feared professional assassin  known as “The Grim Reaper” who disappeared years ago.   After his daughter died he decided to quit and secluded himself in the city. Clean calls Michael and warns him that he knows his address and that he is coming for him. Clean uses his salvage skills to improvise a silencer for a pump shotgun he saws the stock of made of various auto and other parts. Michael prepares all his men to deal with Clean.

Clean crashes the garbage truck into Michael’s home and gets into a shootout with Michael’s men, killing them effortlessly. As Clean looks for Michael, he is surprised by Michael and is beaten by him. Clean turns the fight around and is about to kill Michael when Mikey appears from his room armed with a gun. Michael thinks his son will kill Clean, but Mikey empties the weapon into his father. Mikey then attempts to shoot Clean but is out of ammo.

Some time after the fight,  Dianda’s neighborhood has now been freed from the criminal activities as more kids have come out to play in the street. While pedaling down the street, Dianda notices a garbage truck approaching and smiles.

Cast
 Adrien Brody as Clean
 Glenn Fleshler as Michael
 Richie Merritt as Mikey
 Chandler DuPont as Dianda
 Mykelti Williamson as Travis
 RZA as Pawn Shop Kurt
 Michelle Wilson as Ethel
 John Bianco as Frank
 Gerard Cordero as Vic
 Catherine Nastasi as Mikey's Mom
 Alex Corrado as Tommy 
 Jade Yorker as Dante

Release
The film premiered at the Tribeca Film Festival on June 19, 2021.

On September 1, 2021, it was announced that IFC Films acquired North American distribution rights to the film. It was released in theaters on January 28, 2022. In April 2022, IFC Films signed an output deal with AMC+. The film was released on the streaming service on May 6, 2022.

Reception

Box office
In the United States and Canada, the film earned $162,098 from 254 theaters in its opening weekend.

Critical response

Nick Schager of Variety gave the film a negative review and wrote, "Obvious and derivative in borderline-shameless fashion, it’s a B-movie knock-off with little originality and even less flair." Andrew Mack of Screen Anarchy gave the film a positive review and wrote that Brody and Solet "made a compact vision of the Man With a Past type thriller and given it more emotional heft than most of its predecessors combined".

References

External links
 
 

2021 action thriller films
2020s English-language films
American action thriller films
Hood films
IFC Films films
Films directed by Paul Solet
2020s American films